Young Whirlwind is a 1928 American silent Western film directed by Louis King and starring Buzz Barton, Edmund Cobb and Frank Rice.

Cast
 Buzz Barton as David 'Red' Hepner 
 Edmund Cobb as Jack 
 Frank Rice as Hank 
 Alma Rayford as Molly 
 Thomas G. Lingham as Sheriff 
 Eddy Chandler as Johnson 
 Bill Patton as Bart 
 Tex Phelps as Bandit

References

Bibliography
 Darby, William. Masters of Lens and Light: A Checklist of Major Cinematographers and Their Feature Films. Scarecrow Press, 1991.

External links
 

1928 films
1928 Western (genre) films
1920s English-language films
American black-and-white films
Films directed by Louis King
Film Booking Offices of America films
Silent American Western (genre) films
1920s American films